Fe-TV is a Spanish-language broadcast television network providing Christian programming to the Hispanic community. Based in Harlingen, Texas, the network is an outreach of Faith Pleases God Church, a charismatic megachurch in Harlingen, along with sister network La Familia Network (LFN). In August 2006, the network went off the air for what the Fe-TV website described as rebuilding and expansion. The network expected the downtime to be six months; it turned out to be over a year, as Fe-TV was not seen again until September 2007.

Programming 
Fe-TV programming is very similar to that found on major English-language Christian networks: preaching, Biblical instruction, music and talk shows. Most of the ministers appearing on Fe-TV are Spanish speakers; however, a few English-language ministers, such as Joyce Meyer and Benny Hinn, also appear on the network, their words dubbed into Spanish.

External links
 Official website
Faith Pleases God Church website

Religious television stations in the United States
Spanish-language television networks in the United States
Television channels and stations established in 2005